Woman Magazine may refer to:

 Woman (Australian magazine), published from 1934 to 1954
 Woman (UK magazine), published beginning 1937

See also
 List of women's magazines